Andisheh Municipality and Suburbs Bus Organization is a public transport agency running Transit buses in Andisheh and surrounding areas in Tehran Province.

List of routes

References

Transport in Iran
Bus transport in Iran